Crypsitricha roseata is a species of moth in the family Tineidae. It was described by Edward Meyrick in 1913. This species is endemic to New Zealand. The type locality of this species is the suburb of Wadestown, in Wellington.

The wingspan is about 12 mm. The forewings are light rosy-purple-brownish with about eight small blackish costal marks and an irregular brown mark on the fold towards the base, terminated by a few blackish scales, and edged with some whitish suffusion. There is a narrow oblique brown fascia from before the middle of the costa to beyond the middle of the dorsum, partially edged with blackish posteriorly. A streak of brown suffusion runs from the middle of the disc to the middle of the termen, including a line of black scales, and edged above posteriorly by a fine white streak. The hindwings are grey.

References

Moths described in 1913
Tineidae
Moths of New Zealand
Endemic fauna of New Zealand
Taxa named by Edward Meyrick
Endemic moths of New Zealand